was a Japanese samurai and commander of the Sengoku period who served Azai clan as a senior retainer. His son Kaihō Yūshō was a representative painter of the Azuchi–Momoyama period in Japan.

Tsunachika served as a senior retainer and military commissioner for three generations of the Azai clan.

In 1573, Tsunachika is considered to have been killed in action when Oda Nobunaga attacked and toppled Odani Castle.

References

Samurai
1535 births
1573 deaths
Azai clan